Closure: Live is a 2001 album by the Norwegian gothic metal band Theatre of Tragedy. Recorded live at the Metal festival in Katowice 2000, the CD has ten audio tracks and, on special editions, two multimedia video tracks.

Track listing
 "Intro/And When He Falleth" - 7:41
 "Der Spiegel" - 5:04
 "Cassandra" - 3:46
 "Venus" - 4:49
 "Black as the Devil Painteth" (Remix 2) 4:48
 "Siren" - 6:10
 "Poppæa" - 5:16
 "Bacchante" - 5:51
 "A Distance There Is" - 5:12
 "Der Tanz Der Schatten" - 5:40

Videos
"Cassandra"
"Der Tanz Der Schatten"

Personnel

Theatre of Tragedy
Raymond Rohonyi - vocals
Liv Kristine Espenæs - vocals
Frank Claussen - guitars
Vegard K. Thorsen - guitars
Lorentz Aspen - keyboards
Hein Frode Hansen - drums

Production
Siggi Bemm, Matthias Klinkman - mixing at Woodhouse Studios

References 

Theatre of Tragedy albums
2001 live albums
Massacre Records live albums